Darrin James Pritchard (born 21 March 1966) is a former Australian rules footballer who played for Hawthorn in the Australian Football League.

Pritchard played in three VFL/AFL Premierships with Hawthorn in 1988, 1989 and 1991. Recruited from Sandy Bay in Tasmania, he represented both his home and adopted states at state of origin level, skippering the former on three occasions and he was named in the 1989 VFL Team of the Year. After sustaining a broken leg in 1995 he made a creditable comeback but was never quite the same player. He retired after the 1997 season having played 211 VFL/AFL games.

External links

Australian rules footballers from Hobart
1966 births
Living people
Hawthorn Football Club players
Hawthorn Football Club Premiership players
Tasmanian State of Origin players
Sandy Bay Football Club players
Tasmanian Football Hall of Fame inductees
Allies State of Origin players
Victorian State of Origin players
Three-time VFL/AFL Premiership players